The 1979–80 Major Indoor Soccer League season was the second in league history and would end with the New York Arrows repeating as MISL champions.

Recap
Expansion would increase league membership to 10 teams. There would be a split into two divisions (the Atlantic and Central). The new teams were placed in Buffalo, Hartford, Wichita, Detroit and St. Louis. All but Hartford had a measure of success, as three of the new clubs would make the playoffs and St. Louis averaged over 14,000 fans despite finishing tied for the MISL's worst record.

To accommodate the expanded league, the playoff format was tweaked to include the top three teams in each division. The first round would be a single game between the second and third-place finishers, while the semifinals were a two-game series between the first-place finisher and the first round winner. If the teams were tied at one win apiece, there would be a 15-minute minigame to decide the winner. If the teams remained tied, there would be a MISL-style penalty shootout to break the tie. The winner of the Atlantic Division final would host the championship game.

The Pittsburgh Spirit would recover from a 5–10 start and a coaching change to finish second in the Atlantic, thanks to a league-record 13-game winning streak. They would be joined in the playoffs by the Buffalo Stallions, who snuck into the postseason thanks to the Philadelphia Fever's loss in the season finale. The Stallions qualified due to their 3–1 head-to-head record against the Fever.

In the end, the New York Arrows repeated as champions, thanks to the goalscoring exploits of Steve Zungul. Zungul scored a combined 100 goals (90 in the regular season, 10 in the playoffs) to lead the Arrows, winning both the regular season and playoff MVP awards in the process.

After the season, the Spirit suspended operations for one year. Pittsburgh would return for the 1981–82 season, however.

Teams

Regular season

Schedule

The 1979–80 regular season schedule ran from November 24, 1979, to March 9, 1980. The 32 games per team was an increase of eight over the 1978–79 schedule of 24 games.

Final standings
Playoff teams in bold.

Team attendance

Regular season statistics

Scoring leaders

GP = Games Played, G = Goals, A = Assists, Pts = Points

Goalkeeping leaders
Note: GP = Games played; Min – Minutes played; GA = Goals against; GAA = Goals against average; W = Wins; L = Losses

All-Star Game
The first MISL All-Star game was played at the Checkerdome in St. Louis, Missouri on February 27, 1980. Players were divided up by division. Rosters spots were determined by peer voting, with additional spots decided by the two coaches. A crowd of 16,892 watched the Central Division squad upset the Atlantic, 9–4. On the strength of three goals and one assist, Pat Ercoli of Detroit was named the game's MVP, with Mick Poole of Houston finishing second, and St. Louis' Steve Pecher third.

Central Division roster
Coach: Pat McBride, St. Louis
 *injured, did not play • #replaced injured player

Atlantic Division roster
Coach: Don Popovic, New York
 *injured, did not play • #replaced injured player

Match report

Three Stars of the Match: 1. Pat Ercoli, Detroit; 2. Mick Poole, Houston; 3. Steve Pecher, St. Louis

Playoffs

Bracket

Division Semifinals

Division Finals

Championship Game

 Playoff MVP: Steve Zungul, New York Arrows (3 games, 10 goals)

Playoff statistics

Playoff scoring
GP = Games Played, G = Goals, A = Assists, Pts = Points

Playoff goalkeeping
Note: GP = Games played; Min – Minutes played; GA = Goals against; GAA = Goals against average; W = Wins; L = Losses

League awards
Most Valuable Player: Steve Zungul, New York

Scoring Champion: Steve Zungul, New York

Pass Master: Steve Zungul, New York

Rookie of the Year: Jim Sinclair, Buffalo

Goalkeeper of the Year: Sepp Gantenhammer, Houston

Coach of the Year: Len Bilous, Pittsburgh and Pat McBride, St. Louis

Championship Series Most Valuable Player: Steve Zungul, New York

All-MISL Teams

References

External links
 The Year in American Soccer – 1980
 1979–80 summary at The MISL: A Look Back

Major Indoor Soccer League (1978–1992) seasons
Major
Major